Mavrovouni, meaning black mountain, may refer to several places in Greece:

Mavrovouni, Ioannina, a village in the Ioannina regional unit, part of the municipal unit Kalpaki
Mavrovouni, Laconia, a village in Laconia, part of the municipal unit Gytheio
Mavrovouni, Larissa, a village in the Larissa regional unit, part of the municipal unit Krannonas
Mavrovouni, Pella, a village in the Pella regional unit, part of the municipality Skydra
Mavrovouni Mountain, a mountain in Thessaly
Mavrovouni Ymittou, a peak of the Hymettus mountain in Attica.